Garden City is an unincorporated community and census-designated place (CDP) in Glasscock County, Texas, United States. Garden City serves as the Glasscock County seat, and at the 2010 census had a population of 334. The ZIP code is 79739.

History

Garden City's history began in 1886, when what became the town's post office was established in a general store, and a settlement began to develop in the area around the business. The post office was to be named after the store proprietor, a man by the name of Gardner. However, after a clerical error by officials in Washington, the postal franchise was granted under the name "Garden" City.

Garden City was the first Texas community platted by renowned surveyor W. D. Twichell, a Minnesota native.

In 1893, Glasscock County was organized, and Garden City vied for the county seat along with two other area communities, New California and Dixie. New California was ultimately chosen as the county seat; it was located in a less flood-prone region and had a readily accessible water supply. However, at the time of the county's organization, New California consisted of a mere two dwellings and an equally sparse population, whereas Garden City boasted a school, the general store/post office, and several homes. In a unique compromise, most of Garden City's structures were placed on wheels and relocated to the New California site, and on April 5, 1893, the settlement was renamed Garden City. A two-story stone courthouse was constructed later that same year, followed by a new, larger courthouse in 1910 (with the former building remaining in use as the Glasscock County Jail).

Between 1927 and 1943, Garden City's population fluctuated between 100 and 250, and several businesses and a newspaper (the Garden City Gazette) had come and gone. By 1945, Garden City had eight businesses and a population of 200. In the 1950s, oil was discovered nearby, creating a bit of a boom for the area. While Garden City's population did not experience the spike that other West Texas oil boom towns had seen (the population peaked at 300 in 1968, many years after the boom had ended), it did increase the community's commerce, with the number of operating businesses almost doubling from 1947 to 1968. By 1980, the population had fallen to 293, a figure maintained until 2010, when that year's census counted 334 residents.

The area is conducive to wind power generation, as is much of West Texas, and several wind farms have been proposed for the area.

Limestone from the quarry of TexaStone in Garden City was donated in 2004 for establishment of the Stonehenge replica in Odessa, Texas.

Demographics

2020 census

As of the 2020 United States census, there were 334 people, 78 households, and 67 families residing in the CDP.

Education
Garden City is served by the Glasscock County Independent School District and home to the Garden City High School Bearkats.

Climate
According to the Köppen climate classification system, Garden City has a semiarid climate, BSk on climate maps.

References

External links
 
 

Census-designated places in Glasscock County, Texas
Census-designated places in Texas
Unincorporated communities in Glasscock County, Texas
Unincorporated communities in Texas
County seats in Texas
Populated places established in 1886
1886 establishments in Texas